Phylica is a genus of plants in the family Rhamnaceae. A few species occur in other parts of southern Africa, and on islands including Madagascar, the Mascarene Islands, Île Amsterdam, Saint Helena, Tristan da Cunha, and Gough Island. The oldest fossils of the genus are of Phylica piloburmensis from the Burmese amber of Myanmar, dating to around 99 million years ago during the mid-Cretaceous.

Species
Species in the genus Phylica include:

Phylica abietina Eckl. & Zeyh.
Phylica acmaephylla Eckl. & Zeyh.
Phylica aemula Schltr.
Phylica affinis Sond.
Phylica agathosmoides Pillans
Phylica alba Pillans
Phylica alpina Eckl. & Zeyh.
Phylica alticola Pillans
Phylica altigena Schltr.
Phylica ambigua Sond.
Phylica amoena Pillans
Phylica ampliata Pillans
Phylica anomala Pillans
Phylica apiculata Sond.
Phylica arborea Thouars
Phylica atrata Licht. ex Roem. & Schult.
Phylica axillaris Lam.
Phylica barbata Pillans
Phylica barnardii Pillans
Phylica bathiei Pillans
Phylica bicolor L.
Phylica bolusii Pillans
Phylica brachycephala Sond.
Phylica brevifolia Eckl. & Zeyh.
Phylica burchellii Pillans
Phylica buxifolia L.
Phylica calcarata Pillans
Phylica callosa L.f.
Phylica capitata Thunb.
Phylica cephalantha Sond.
Phylica chionocephala Schltr.
Phylica chionophila Schltr.
Phylica comosa Sond.
Phylica comptonii Pillans
Phylica confusa Pillans
Phylica constricta Pillans
Phylica cordata L.
Phylica costata Pillans
Phylica cryptandroides Sond.
Phylica curvifolia Pillans
Phylica cuspidata Eckl. & Zeyh.
Phylica cylindrica J.C.Wendl.
Phylica debilis Eckl. & Zeyh.
Phylica diffusa Pillans
Phylica dioica L.
Phylica diosmoides Sond.
Phylica disticha Eckl. & Zeyh.
Phylica dodii N.E.Br.
Phylica elimensis Pillans
Phylica emirnensis (Tul.) Pillans
Phylica ericoides L.
Phylica eriophoros P.J.Bergius
Phylica excelsa J.C.Wendl.
Phylica floccosa Pillans
Phylica floribunda Pillans
Phylica fourcadei Pillans
Phylica fruticosa Schltr.
Phylica fulva Eckl. & Zeyh.
Phylica galpinii Pillans
Phylica glabrata Thunb.
Phylica gnidioides Eckl. & Zeyh.
Phylica gracilis (Eckl. & Zeyh.) D.Dietr.
Phylica greyii Pillans
Phylica guthriei Pillans
Phylica harveyi (Arn.) Pillans
Phylica hirta Pillans
Phylica humilis Sond.
Phylica imberbis P.J.Bergius
Phylica incurvata Pillans
Phylica insignis Pillans
Phylica intrusa Pillans
Phylica karroica Pillans
Phylica keetii Pillans
Phylica lachneaeoides Pillans
Phylica laevifolia Pillans
Phylica laevigata Pillans
Phylica laevis (Schltdl.) Steud.
Phylica lanata Pillans
Phylica lasiantha Pillans
Phylica lasiocarpa Sond.
Phylica leipoldtii Pillans
Phylica levynsiae Pillans
Phylica linifolia Pillans
Phylica litoralis (Eckl. & Zeyh.) D.Dietr.
Phylica longimontana Pillans
Phylica lucens Pillans
Phylica lucida Pillans
Phylica lutescens (Eckl. & Zeyh.) D.Dietr.
Phylica madagascariensis Reissek ex Engler
Phylica mairei Pillans
Phylica marlothii Pillans
Phylica maximiliani Schltr.
Phylica meyeri Sond.
Phylica microphylla (Eckl. & Zeyh.) D.Dietr.
Phylica minutiflora Schltr.
Phylica montana Sond.
Phylica mundii Pillans
Phylica natalensis Pillans
Phylica nervosa Pillans
Phylica nigrita Sond.
Phylica nigromontana Pillans
Phylica nitida Lam.
Phylica nodosa Pillans
Phylica obtusifolia Pillans
Phylica odorata Schltr.
Phylica oleaefolia Vent.
Phylica oleoides DC.
Phylica paniculata Willd.
Phylica papillosa J.C.Wendl.
Phylica parviflora P.J.Bergius
Phylica parvula Pillans
Phylica pauciflora Pillans
Phylica pearsonii Pillans
Phylica pedicellata DC.
Phylica pinea Thunb.
Phylica pinifolia L.f.
Phylica piquetbergensis Pillans
Phylica plumigera Pillans
Phylica plumosa L.
Phylica polifolia (Vahl) Pillans
Phylica propinqua Sond.
Phylica pubescens Aiton
Phylica pulchella Schltr.
Phylica purpurea Sond.
Phylica pustulata E.Phillips
Phylica radiata L.
Phylica reclinata J.C.Wendl.
Phylica recurvifolia Eckl. & Zeyh.
Phylica reflexa Lam.
Phylica retorta Pillans
Phylica retrorsa E.Mey. ex Sond.
Phylica reversa Pillans
Phylica rigida Eckl. & Zeyh.
Phylica rigidifolia Sond.
Phylica rogersii Pillans
Phylica rosmarinifolia Thunb.
Phylica rubra Willd. ex Roem. & Schult.
Phylica salteri Pillans
Phylica schlechteri Pillans
Phylica selaginoides Sond.
Phylica sericea Pillans
Phylica simii Pillans
Phylica spicata L.f.
Phylica squarrosa Vent.
Phylica stenantha Pillans
Phylica stenopetala Schltr.
Phylica stipularis L.
Phylica stokoei Pillans
Phylica strigosa P.J.Bergius
Phylica strigulosa Sond.
Phylica subulifolia Pillans
Phylica thodei E.Phillips
Phylica thunbergiana E.Mey. ex Sond.
Phylica tortuosa E.Mey. ex Harv. & Sond.
Phylica trachyphylla (Eckl. & Zeyh.) D.Dietr.
Phylica trichotoma Thunb.
Phylica tropica Baker
Phylica tuberculata Pillans
Phylica tubulosa Schltr.
Phylica tysonii Pillans
Phylica variabilis Pillans
Phylica velutina Sond.
Phylica villosa Thunb.
Phylica vulgaris Pillans
Phylica willdenowiana Eckl. & Zeyh.
Phylica wittebergensis Pillans

References

External links

 
Rhamnaceae genera
Taxonomy articles created by Polbot